The following highways are numbered 738:

Costa Rica
 National Route 738

Ireland
 R738 regional road

United States

Canada 
  Saskatchewan Highway 738